La Marcia dei Bersaglieri or March of the Bersaglieri in English, is the official hymn of the Bersaglieri Corps, an elite unit of the Italian Army. It was composed in 1860, just 25 years after the creation of the corps, by army officer Giulio Ricordi, with words to the composition being written by poet Giuseppe Regaldi. 2 years later, Peter Ludwig Hertel made a version of the march for Paolo Taglioni's ballet Flik Flok, which later arranged by Raffaele Cuconato took the form known and played todayToday, the march is the flagship of the corps's tradition as it is played by the various Italian Bersaglieri Bands that exist.

Lyrics

References

External links 
 The full march

1860 compositions
1860 songs
Italian military marches
march